Elsie Paitai-Hovell (b. 20 February 1963) is a former rugby union player. She made her debut for the Black Ferns on 30 August 1990 against the United States at Christchurch. She was selected for the 1991 Women's Rugby World Cup squad, but didn't feature in the World Cup itself.

Paitai-Hovell played club rugby for Ponsonby.

References 

1963 births
Living people
New Zealand female rugby union players
New Zealand women's international rugby union players
New Zealand sportspeople of Cook Island descent